Pittsburgh Historic District may refer to:

Pittsburgh Central Downtown Historic District, Pittsburgh, Pennsylvania, listed on the NRHP in Pennsylvania
Pittsburgh Historic District (Atlanta, Georgia), listed on the NRHP in Fulton County, Georgia